Godspeed is an American metal band formed in 1992. Following the release of their debut album Ride on Atlantic Records, the band embarked on two high-profile tours as the opening act for Black Sabbath and Dio. They gained attention with an appearance on the 1994 Black Sabbath tribute album Nativity in Black, on which they teamed up with vocalist Bruce Dickinson of Iron Maiden to record a cover of the Black Sabbath song "Sabbath Bloody Sabbath".

After the band's late 1990s breakup, bassist Chris Kosnik and guitarist Tommy Southard went on to contribute to the stoner rock movement with their own bands the Atomic Bitchwax and Solace for nearly two decades.

Godspeed's original line-up reunited in 2012 to record new material and undertake a tour in mid-2013.

Band members
David Blanche – vocals (later member of Eccentri Bohemian's)
Tommy Southard – guitar (current member of Solace)
Rob Hultz – bass (current member of Solace, formerly of Lethal Aggression)
Chris Kosnik – bass (current member of the Atomic Bitchwax and Monster Magnet)
Tim Schoenleber – drums

Discography
Ride (1994)

References

Heavy metal musical groups from New Jersey
American stoner rock musical groups
Musical groups established in 1994
Musical groups disestablished in 1996
Musical groups reestablished in 2012